Yaki-Da were a Swedish pop group consisting of singers Marie Knutsen and Linda Schönberg. They were put together by Ace of Base band member and producer Jonas "Joker" Berggren. Berggren produced their entire first album and wrote all but two of the songs appearing on it.

They released their first album, Pride, in 1995 and the album's lead single, "I Saw You Dancing", reached number 54 on the Billboard Hot 100 and number 11 on the Billboard Dance Charts. They were somewhat more successful in Europe, Latin America and Asia.

Their second album, A Small Step For Love, was released in 1998.  It featured no collaborations with Jonas Berggren. The album spawned one single, entitled "I Believe". The song and album saw a very limited release in Europe and Korea. A music video, shot inside of a Korean airport (but featuring Chinese characters), was released for "I Believe".

One of the songs Jonas Berggren wrote and produced for Pride, "Show Me Love", was re-recorded by Berggren's own band, Ace of Base, for their 2002 album, Da Capo.

Discography

Albums
1995 Pride (SE #37, NO #2)
1998 A Small Step for Love

Singles

References

External links
Last.fm's Yaki Da page

Ace of Base
Swedish electronic music groups
Swedish dance music groups
Swedish Eurodance groups
Musical groups established in 1994
Musical groups disestablished in 2000
1994 establishments in Sweden
2000 disestablishments in Sweden
English-language singers from Sweden